Nestor Väänänen (1 July 1877, Maaninka - 13 April 1930) was a Finnish farmer and politician. He was a member of the Parliament of Finland from 1911 to 1916, representing the Social Democratic Party of Finland (SDP).

References

1877 births
1930 deaths
People from Maaninka
People from Kuopio Province (Grand Duchy of Finland)
Social Democratic Party of Finland politicians
Members of the Parliament of Finland (1911–13)
Members of the Parliament of Finland (1913–16)